Malheur County is one of the 36 counties in the U.S. state of Oregon. As of the 2020 census, the population was 31,571. Its county seat is Vale, and its largest city is Ontario. The county was named after the Malheur River, which runs through the county. The word "malheur" is French for misfortune or tragedy. Malheur County is included in the Ontario, Oregon Micropolitan Statistical Area, which is also included in the Boise Combined Statistical Area. It is included in the eight-county definition of Eastern Oregon.

History
Malheur County was created February 17, 1887, from the southern territory of Baker County. It was first settled by miners and stockmen in the early 1860s. The discovery of gold in 1863 attracted further development, including settlements and ranches. Basques settled in the region in the 1890s and were mainly engaged in sheep raising.

Geography

It is the second-largest county in Oregon by area and the only county in Oregon in the Mountain Time Zone.

Adjacent counties

 Grant County - northwest/Pacific Time Border
 Baker County - north/Pacific Time Border
 Washington County, Idaho - northeast
 Payette County, Idaho - east
 Canyon County, Idaho - east
 Owyhee County, Idaho - east
 Humboldt County, Nevada - south
 Harney County - west/Pacific Time Border

National protected areas
Deer Flat National Wildlife Refuge (part)
Malheur National Forest (part)
Whitman National Forest (part)

Highways

Railroads
The main railroad in Malheur County is the Oregon Eastern Railroad. This line goes from Ontario to the Celatom Plant in Vale. This railroad is all that's left of the Wyoming Colorado Railroad, a shot line between Colorado, Wyoming and Oregon.

Time zones

Malheur County is one of the few counties in the United States with two time zones. Most of the county is in the Mountain Time Zone, but a small portion in the south is in the Pacific Time Zone, indicative of that area's proximity to its main service town, Winnemucca, Nevada.

Demographics

2000 census
As of the census of 2000, there were 31,615 people, 10,221 households, and 7,348 families living in the county. The population density was 3 people per square mile (1.2/km2). There were 11,233 housing units at an average density of 1 per square mile (0.4/km2). The racial makeup of the county was:
75.78% White
1.22% Black or African American
1.02% Native American
1.96% Asian
0.08% Pacific Islander
17.38% from other races
 2.56% from two or more races

25.62% of the population were Hispanic or Latino of any race. 14.2% were of German, 10.5% English, 8.4% American and 6.9% Irish ancestry. 79.4% spoke English and 19.4% Spanish as their first language.

There were 10,221 households, out of which 36.20% had children under the age of 18 living with them, 57.30% were married couples living together, 10.40% had a female householder with no husband present, and 28.10% were non-families. 23.70% of all households were made up of individuals, and 12.00% had someone living alone who was 65 years of age or older. The average household size was 2.77 and the average family size was 3.28.

In the county, the population was spread out, with 27.60% under the age of 18, 10.60% from 18 to 24, 27.20% from 25 to 44, 21.00% from 45 to 64, and 13.70% who were 65 years of age or older. The median age was 34 years. For every 100 females, there were 116.00 males. For every 100 females age 18 and over, there were 121.20 males.

The median income for a household in the county was $30,241, and the median income for a family was $35,672. Males had a median income of $25,489 versus $21,764 for females. The per capita income for the county was $13,895. About 14.60% of families and 18.60% of the population were below the poverty line, including 25.80% of those under age 18 and 11.60% of those age 65 or over.

Malheur County is the poorest county in Oregon. As of 2008, 21% of its residents live in poverty.

2010 census
As of the 2010 census, there were 31,313 people, 10,411 households, and 7,149 families living in the county. The racial makeup of the county was 77.5% white, 1.7% Asian, 1.2% American Indian, 1.2% black or African American, 0.1% Pacific islander, 15.5% from other races, and 2.9% from two or more races. Those of Hispanic or Latino origin made up 31.5% of the population. In terms of ancestry, 16.2% were German, 11.9% were English, 10.3% were Irish, and 9.9% were American.

Of the 10,411 households, 34.8% had children under the age of 18 living with them, 51.6% were married couples living together, 11.8% had a female householder with no husband present, 31.3% were non-families, and 26.0% of all households were made up of individuals. The average household size was 2.69 and the average family size was 3.24. The median age was 36.2 years.

The median income for a household in the county was $39,144 and the median income for a family was $46,136. Males had a median income of $33,234 versus $27,883 for females. The per capita income for the county was $16,335. About 15.2% of families and 22.7% of the population were below the poverty line, including 27.1% of those under age 18 and 10.5% of those age 65 or over.

2020 census
As of the 2020 census, there were 31,571 people residing in the county.

Politics

Like most counties in eastern Oregon, the majority of registered voters who are part of a political party in Malheur County are members of the Republican Party. In the 2008 presidential election, 69.10% of Malheur County voters voted for Republican John McCain, while 28.47% voted for Democrat Barack Obama and 2.42% of voters voted for a third-party candidate. These statistics do not include write-in votes. These numbers show a small shift towards the Democratic candidate when compared to the 2004 presidential election, in which 74.9% of Malheur Country voters voted for George W. Bush, while 23.8% voted for John Kerry, and 1.3% of voters either voted for a third-party candidate or wrote in a candidate.

Malheur County is one of the dominant Republican counties in Oregon when it comes to presidential elections. It was one of only two counties in Oregon to give the majority of its vote to Barry Goldwater and has favored the Republican candidate for decades. The last Democratic candidate to carry the county was Franklin D. Roosevelt in 1940, and only by a margin of 29 votes. Further every Republican candidate since 1996 has received more than 60% of the county's vote. Malheur County is also one of the most reliably Republican counties in state elections, for example in the 1998 gubernatorial election it was the only county to vote for Bill Sizemore instead of John Kitzhaber, and in the 1998 U.S. Senate election, it was the only county to vote for state senator John Lim over Ron Wyden.

As part of Oregon's 2nd congressional district it has been represented by Republican Cliff Bentz since 2021. In the Oregon Legislature, Malheur County is within Oregon's 30th Senate district, represented by Republican Lynn Findley. It’s also within the 60th District in the Oregon House, which is represented by Republican Mark Owens.

Economy
The county is 94% rangeland, with the Bureau of Land Management controlling 72% of the land. Irrigated fields in the county's northeast corner, known as Western Treasure Valley, are the center of intensive and diversified farming. Malheur County's economy also depends on tourism.

The county's two largest employers are Heinz of Ontario, a potato processor branded as Ore-Ida, and the Snake River Correctional Institution, five miles northwest of Ontario.

Communities

Cities
Adrian
Jordan Valley
Nyssa
Ontario
Vale (county seat)

Census-designated places 

 Annex

 Brogan

 Harper

 Juntura

Unincorporated communities

Arock
Basque
Beulah
Burns Junction
Cairo
Crowley
Danner
Ironside
Jamieson
Jonesboro
McDermitt, Nevada-Oregon
Owyhee
Payette Junction
Riverside
Rockville
Rome
Willowcreek

Ghost towns
Inskip Station
Leslie Gulch
Malheur
Westfall

Education

K-12 schools
School districts include:
 Adrian School District 61
 Annex School District 29
 students who graduate from Annex attend Weiser High School, of the Weiser School District, in Weiser, Idaho.
 Arock School District 81
 Burnt River School District 30J
 Harper School District 66
 Huntington School District 16J
 Jordan Valley School District 3
 Juntura School District 12 (elementary only)
 McDermitt School District 51 (a.k.a. Malheur County School District #51) - A district with no employees, it sends all of its students to McDermitt Combined School in McDermitt, Nevada and Oregon, a school operated by the Humboldt County School District. Circa 2022, around 80% of the district's 64 residents are in the ranching industry. Circa 2006, 16 students, of all grade levels, lived in the district. In 2006 the district possessed a school building that was no longer used.
 Nyssa School District 26
 Ontario School District 8
 Vale School District 84

There is a charter school in Ontario, Four Rivers Community School (4RCC).

Private schools, both in Ontario, include:
Treasure Valley Christian School 
St. Peter Catholic School of the Roman Catholic Diocese of Baker

Previously Crane Union High School in Harney County served sections of Malheur County.

Tertiary education
Treasure Valley Community College is in Ontario.

A portion of the county is in the TVCC district. The remainder is not in any community college district.

Public libraries
Vale has the Emma Humphrey Library. Ontario Community Library of the Ontario Library District is in Ontario.

See also
National Register of Historic Places listings in Malheur County, Oregon
Malheur Enterprise, local newspaper of public record

References

External links

 Malheur County (official website)
 Information about Malheur County from Oregon State University Malheur Experiment Station

 
Ontario, Oregon micropolitan area
Counties in multiple time zones
Basque-American culture in Oregon
1887 establishments in Oregon
Populated places established in 1887